Nothum is a village in the commune of Lac de la Haute-Sûre, in north-western Luxembourg .  , the village had a population of 153.

Lac de la Haute-Sûre
Villages in Luxembourg